Arthur Margetson (27 April 1887 – 13 August 1951) was a British stage and film actor.

Margetson worked as a stockbroker before he became an actor.

In 1936, Margetson married actress Shirley Grey.

Filmography
 Wolves (1930) as Mark (film debut)
 Other People's Sins (1931) as Bernard Barrington
 Many Waters (1931) as Jim Barcaldine
 His Grace Gives Notice (1933) as George Barwick
 The Great Defender (1934) as Leslie Locke
 Little Friend (1934) as Hilliard
 Royal Cavalcade (1935) as Dining Officer
 The Mystery of the Mary Celeste (1935) as Capt. Benjamin Briggs
 The Divine Spark (1935) as Ernesto Tosi
 I Give My Heart (1935) as Count Du Barry
 Music Hath Charms (1935) as Alan Sterling
 Broken Blossoms (1936) as Battling Burrows
 Juggernaut (1936) as Roger Clifford
 Head Office (1936) as Dixon
 Pagliacci (1936) as Tonio
 Smash and Grab (1937) as Malvern
 Action for Slander (1938) as Capt. Hugh Bradford
 The Return of Carol Deane (1938) as Mark Poynton
 Me and My Pal (1939) as Andrews
 The Nursemaid Who Disappeared (1939) as Det. Antony Gethryn
 Return to Yesterday (1940) as Osbert
 Random Harvest (1942) as Chetwynd
 Commandos Strike at Dawn (1942) as German Colonel
 Thumbs Up (1943) as Bert Lawrence
 Sherlock Holmes Faces Death (1943) as Dr. Bob Sexton (final film)

References

External links
 
 

1887 births
1951 deaths
English male film actors
Male actors from London
English male stage actors
20th-century English male actors